The eastern diamondback rattlesnake (Crotalus adamanteus) is a species of pit viper in the family Viperidae. The species is endemic to the Southeastern United States. It is one of the heaviest venomous snakes in the Americas and the largest rattlesnake. No subspecies are recognized.

Description

However, other venomous snakes may rival this species in weight such as the much longer but more slender king cobra and the shorter but even bulkier Gaboon viper. However, the stated maximum sizes have been called into question due to a lack of voucher specimens. Males are typically larger than females, which is rare among snakes (females are usually larger than males).

Klauber (1998) included a letter he received from E. Ross Allen in 1953, in which Allen explains how for years he offered a reward of $100, and later $200, for an  specimen, dead or alive. The reward was never claimed. A  specimen was caught and killed outside a neighborhood in St. Augustine, Florida in September 2009.

The average size is much less. Specimens are rarely found over 6 feet in length. One study found an average length of  based on 31 males and 43 females. Few specimens can exceed , although exceptional specimens can weigh  or more.

The scalation includes 25–31 (usually 29) rows of dorsal scales at midbody, 165–176/170–187 ventral scales in males/females and 27–33/20–26 subcaudal scales in males/females, respectively. On the head, the rostral scale is higher than it is wide and contacts two internasal scales. There are 10–21 scales in the internasal-prefrontal region and 5–11 (usually 7–8) intersupraocular scales. Usually, there are two loreal scales between preoculars and the postnasal. There are 12–17 (usually 14–15) supralabial scales, the first of which is in broad contact with the prenasal, and 15–21 (usually 17–18) sublabial scales.

The color pattern consists of a brownish, brownish-yellow, brownish-gray or olive ground color, overlaid with a series of 24–35 dark brown to black diamonds with slightly lighter centers. Each of these diamond-shaped blotches is outlined with a row of cream or yellowish scales. Posteriorly, the diamond shapes become more like crossbands and are followed by 5–10 bands around the tail. The belly is a yellowish or cream-colored, with diffused, dark mottling along the sides. The head has a dark postocular stripe that extends from behind the eye backwards and downwards to the lip; the back of the stripe touches the angle of the mouth. Anteriorly and posteriorly, the postocular stripe is bordered by distinct white or yellow stripes. The rattle at the end of their tail is made of hard, loosely attached, hollow segments which break off frequently and are completely replaced when the snake sheds.

Common names
Other common names for this snake species include eastern diamond-backed rattlesnake, eastern diamondback, diamond rattlesnake, diamond-back rattlesnake, common rattlesnake, diamond-back, diamond(-patch) rattler, eastern diamond-back (rattlesnake), eastern diamond rattlesnake, Florida diamond-back (rattlesnake), Florida rattlesnake, lozenge-spotted rattlesnake, rattler, rattlesnake, southeastern diamond-backed rattlesnake, southeastern diamond-backed rattler, southern woodland rattler, timber rattler, water rattle, water rattlesnake, and diamondback rattlesnake.

Geographic range
The eastern diamondback rattlesnake is found in the Southeastern United States from southeastern North Carolina, south along the coastal plain through peninsular Florida to the Florida Keys, and west along the Gulf Coast through southern Alabama and Mississippi to southeastern Louisiana. The original description for the species does not include a type locality, although Schmidt (1953) proposed it be restricted to "Charleston, South Carolina" (USA).

Conservation status
This snake species is classified as Least Concern on the IUCN Red List (v3.1, 2001). Species are listed as such owing to their wide distribution or presumed large population, or because they are unlikely to be declining fast enough to qualify for listing in a more threatened category. The population trend was down when assessed in 2007.

In North Carolina, the eastern diamondback rattlesnake is protected by state law and considered endangered within the state. It is likely extirpated in Louisiana, having last been observed there in 1995. In fact some scientists and conservationists believe it may even be extirpated in North Carolina, having last been observed there in the early 1990s.

This species is currently under review for being added to the Endangered Species List by the United States Fish and Wildlife Service owing to its recent decline, and the current population represents only 3% of the historical population.

Habitat
The eastern diamondback rattlesnake inhabits upland dry pine forest, pine and palmetto flatwoods, sandhills and coastal maritime hammocks, longleaf pine/turkey oak habitats, grass-sedge marshes and swamp forest, cypress swamps, mesic hammocks, sandy mixed woodlands, xeric hammocks, and salt marshes, as well as wet prairies during dry periods. In many areas, it seems to use burrows made by gophers and gopher tortoises during the summer and winter.

Behavior
 
The eastern diamondback rattlesnake frequently shelters by tunneling in gopher and tortoise burrows, emerging in the early morning or afternoon to bask.

Like most rattlesnakes, this species is terrestrial and not adept at climbing. However, it has on occasion been reported in bushes and trees, apparently in search of prey.

It is also known to be an excellent swimmer. Specimens have often been spotted crossing stretches of water between barrier islands and the mainland off the Georgia coast, in the Gulf of Mexico and in the Florida Keys, sometimes miles from land.

The rattle is well developed and can be heard from relatively far away. When threatened, it raises the anterior half of the body off the ground in an S-shaped coil, and can strike to a distance of at least a third of its body length. Many will stand their ground and may strike repeatedly, but if given the opportunity, they will usually retreat while facing the intruder and moving backwards towards shelter, after which they disappear.

One popular myth is that the eastern diamondback rattlesnake must rattle before striking.  To the contrary, it is quite capable of striking while remaining completely silent.

Hawks, eagles, and other snakes have been known to prey upon young and adolescent specimens of the eastern diamondback rattlesnake.

Feeding
The eastern diamondback rattlesnake forages actively or lies in ambush for small mammals, especially rabbits and rice rats (Oryzomys). The diet also includes birds. Prey is struck and released, after which the snake follows the scent trail left by the dying prey.

Because of their large size, adults have no problem eating prey as large as fully grown cottontail rabbits. As the juveniles are capable of swallowing adult mice, they do not often resort to eating slimmer prey, such as lizards. In fact, eastern cottontails and marsh rabbits (Sylvilagus) form the bulk of the diet in most parts of Florida. Squirrels, rats, and mice are also eaten, along with birds such as towhees and bobwhite quail. Other prey that have been reported include a king rail, a young wild turkey, and a mother woodpecker along with four of her eggs.
It also eats large insects.

Reproduction
Rattlesnakes, including the eastern diamondback, are ovoviviparous. Gestation lasts six or seven months and broods average about a dozen young. However, the young only stay with the mother 10–20 days before they set off on their own to hunt and find cover.

Females give birth to between 7 and 21 young at a time, usually between July and early October.

Captivity
The eastern diamondback can live beyond 20 years, but life expectancy in the wild is now typically shorter because of hunting and human expansion.

Adult wild-caught specimens are often difficult to maintain in captivity, but captive-born individuals do quite well and feed readily on killed laboratory rodents.

Venom

The eastern diamondback rattlesnake has the reputation of being the most dangerous venomous snake in North America. While not usually aggressive, it is large and powerful. Wright and Wright mentioned a mortality rate of 30%, but other studies show a mortality rate of 10–20% (untreated).

It has a very high venom yield, an average of 400–450 mg, with a maximum of 858–1,000 mg. Brown gives an average venom yield of 410 mg (dried venom), along with  values of 1.3–2.4 mg/kg IV, 1.7–3.0 mg/kg IP and 14.5–10 mg/kg SC for toxicity. The estimated human lethal dose is 100–150 mg.

The venom contains a thrombin-like enzyme, "crotalase", capable of clotting fibrinogen, leading to the secondary activation of plasminogen from endothelial cells. Although the venom does not activate platelets, the production of fibrin strands can result in a reduced platelet count, as well as the hemolysis of red blood cells (see article on MAHA). Even with this defibrination, however, clinically significant bleeding is uncommon. Nevertheless, the venom does exhibit high hemorrhagic activity. It also contains a low-molecular-weight basic peptide that impedes neuromuscular transmission and can in theory lead to cardiac failure. This peptide is similar to crotamine from C. durrisus terrificus, and makes up 2–8% of the protein found in the venom. In general, the venom can be described as highly necrotizing, mildly proteolytic and containing a large phosphodiesterase fraction. It stimulates the release of bradykinin that can result in severe pain, as well as profound, transient hypotension.

Klauber described one case in which the symptoms included instant pain "like two hot hypodermic needles", spontaneous bleeding from the bite site, intense internal pain, bleeding from the mouth, hypotension, a weak pulse, swelling and discoloration of the affected limb, and associated severe pain. The symptoms were further described as strongly hemolytic and hemorrhagic.

CroFab, ANAVIP, and Wyeth's ACP are effective antivenins against bites from this species, although massive doses may be needed to manage severe cases of envenomation. Generally, ACP is very effective at countering the defibrination syndrome that is often seen, but may do little for low platelet counts. Wyeth's ACP is no longer being manufactured.

References

Further reading

Brattstrom BH (1954). "The fossil pit-vipers (Reptilia: Crotalidae) of North America". Transactions of the San Diego Society of Natural History 12: 31-46 [35].
Brickell J (1805). "Miscellaneous chemical and medical facts, observations and conjectures". Philadelphia Med. and Phys. Jour. 2: 164 [164].
Conant R, Bridges W (1939). What Snake Is That?: A Field Guide to the Snakes of the United States East of the Rocky Mountains. ( With 108 drawings by Edmond Malnate). New York and London: D. Appleton-Century Company. Frontispiece map + viii + 163 pp. + Plates A-C, 1-32. (Crotalus adamanteus, pp. 145–147 + Plate 30, Figure 86).
Cope ED (1867). "On the Reptilia and Batrachia of the Sonoran province of the Nearctic region". Proceedings of the Academy of Natural Sciences of Philadelphia 18: 300-314 [307].
Cope ED (1875). Check-list of North American Batrachia and Reptiles with a systematic list of higher groups, and an essay on geographical distribution based on specimens contained in the United States National Museum. Washington, District of Columbia: Government Printing Office. 104 pp.
Ditmars RL (1936). The Reptiles of North America: A review of the crocodilians, lizards, snakes, turtles and tortoises inhabiting the United States and northern Mexico. Garden City, New York: Doubleday, Doran & Co. i-xvi + 476 pp.
Goin CJ, Goin OB, Zug GR (1978). Introduction to Herpetology, Third Edition. San Francisco: W.H. Freeman and Company. xi + 378 pp. . (Crotalus adamanteus, pp. 155, 333, Figure16-23).

 (in French).

Klauber LM (1956). Rattlesnakes: Their Habits, Life Histories and Influence on Mankind. 1st edition. Berkeley and Los Angeles, California: University of California Press. 1,708 pp. [29, fig. 2.11].
Klauber LM (1972). Rattlesnakes: Their Habits, Life Histories, and Influence on Mankind. 2nd edition. 2 Volumes. Berkeley, California: University of California Press.

Minton SA (1974). Venom diseases. Springfield, Illinois: Charles C. Thomas. 235 pp.
Palisot de Beauvois AMFJ (1799). "Memoir on Amphibia. Serpents". Transactions of the American Philosophical Society 4: 362-381 [368]. (Crotalus adamanteus, new species).
Schmidt KP (1953). A Check List of North American Amphibians and Reptiles, Sixth Edition. Chicago: American Society of Ichthyologists and Herpetologists. 280 pp.
Schmidt KP, Davis DD (1941). Field Book of Snakes of the United States and Canada. New York: G.P. Putnam's Sons. 365 pp., 34 plates, 103 figures. (Crotalus adamanteus, pp. 297–298).
Smith HM, Brodie ED Jr (1982). Reptiles of North America: A Guide to Field Identification. New York: Golden Press. 240 pp.  (hardcover),  (paperback). (Crotalus adamanteus, pp. 202–203).
Sonnini CS, Latreille PA (1801). Histoire naturelle des reptiles, avec figures dissinées d'après nature. 4 Vols. Paris: Deterville. (in French).  [for a discussion of the publication date see Harper F (1940). American Midland Naturalist 23: 692-723.].
Zim HS, Smith HM (1956). Reptiles and Amphibians: A Guide to Familiar American Species: A Golden Nature Guide. New York: Simon and Schuster. 160 pp. (Crotalus adamanteus, pp. 11–112, 156).

External links

Eastern Diamondback Rattlesnake  at Yale Herpetology Page . Accessed 2 March 2007.
Eastern Diamondback Rattlesnake at Biology Dept., Davidson College. Accessed 2 March 2007.
Images of Crotalus adamanteus at SREL Herpetology. Accessed 2 March 2007.
Crotalus adamanteus at Munich AntiVenom INdex. Accessed 2 March 2007.

adamanteus
Fauna of the Southeastern United States
Snakes of North America
Reptiles described in 1799
Taxa named by Palisot de Beauvois